Eberhard Rosemberger (?-1527) was a German renaissance architect from Kraków, who together with Francesco Fiorentino rebuilt the Wawel Royal Castle in Kraków under the rule of Alexander of Poland after it burned down in 1499.

Architects from Kraków
Renaissance architects